A Dangerous Affair may refer to:

A Dangerous Affair (1919 film), an American drama film directed by Charles Miller
A Dangerous Affair (1931 film), an American mystery film directed by Edward Sedgwick
A Dangerous Affair (1995 film), an American made-for-television thriller film directed by Alan Metzger

See also
The Dangerous Affair, a 2015 Chinese suspense thriller film directed by Zeyan Wang
"Dangerous Affair", a 2017 single by Zoë (Austrian singer)